Bernard Quainoo (born 1 February 1987) is a Dutch retired footballer who is last known to have played as a forward for Rupel Boom.

Career

As a youth player, Quainoo joined the youth academy of Dutch top flight side PSV but left due to injury. In 2006, he signed for Helmond Sport in the Dutch second division, where he made 8 league appearances and scored 1 goal. On 18 August 2006, Quainoo debuted for Helmond Sport during a 1–2 loss to Telstar. On 6 October 2006, he scored his first goal for Helmond Sport during a 1–1 draw with PEC Zwolle.

In 2011, Quainoo signed for English sixth division club Bishop's Stortford after being invited to train with Tottenham in the English Premier League. In 2012, he signed for Belgian third division team Rupel Boom.

References

External links
 

Dutch footballers
Living people
Expatriate footballers in Belgium
Association football forwards
Expatriate footballers in England
Helmond Sport players
HFC Haarlem players
Bishop's Stortford F.C. players
1987 births